This is a list of airports in North Carolina (a U.S. state), grouped by type and sorted by location. It contains all public-use and military airports in the state. Some private-use and former airports may be included where notable, such as airports that were previously public-use, those with commercial enplanements recorded by the FAA or airports assigned an IATA airport code.

Airports

See also
 North Carolina World War II Army Airfields
 Wikipedia:WikiProject Aviation/Airline destination lists: North America#North Carolina

References 

Federal Aviation Administration (FAA):
 FAA Airport Data (Form 5010) from National Flight Data Center (NFDC), also available from AirportIQ 5010
 National Plan of Integrated Airport Systems (2017–2021), updated September 2016
 Passenger Boarding (Enplanement) Data for CY 2016 (final), updated October 2017

North Carolina Department of Transportation (NCDOT):
 Division of Aviation
 Airport Locations

Other sites used as a reference when compiling and updating this list:
 Aviation Safety Network – used to check IATA airport codes
 Great Circle Mapper: Airports in North Carolina – used to check IATA and ICAO airport codes
 Abandoned & Little-Known Airfields: North Carolina – used for information on former airports

 
North Carolina
Airports
Airports